1,8-Cineole synthase (EC 4.2.3.108, 1,8-cineole cyclase, geranyl pyrophoshate:1,8-cineole cyclase, 1,8-cineole synthetase) is an enzyme with systematic name geranyl-diphosphate diphosphate-lyase (cyclizing, 1,8-cineole-forming). This enzyme catalyses the following chemical reaction

 geranyl diphosphate + H2O  1,8-cineole + diphosphate

This enzyme requires Mn2+ or Zn2+.

References

External links 
 

EC 4.2.3